Altshausen station is a railway station in the municipality of Altshausen, located in the Ravensburg district in Baden-Württemberg, Germany.

References

Railway stations in Baden-Württemberg
Buildings and structures in Ravensburg (district)